Crestview Preparatory School is a public charter high school in Phoenix, Arizona. It is operated by The Leona Group.

For athletics, it is a member of the Canyon Athletic Association (CAA).

Public high schools in Arizona
The Leona Group
Charter schools in Arizona